The Charles County school system (CCPS) is a public school system run by the publicly-elected Charles County Board of Education and is funded by Charles County, Maryland through taxpayer money allocated by the Charles County Board of Commissioners.

Located south of Washington, D.C., in Charles County, Maryland, CCPS is one of the fastest growing school systems in Maryland. The mission of CCPS is to provide an opportunity for all school-aged children to receive an academically challenging, quality education that builds character, equips for leadership and prepares for life, in an environment that is safe and conducive to learning.

Board of Education 
An eight-member elected Board of Education serves the educational needs and interests of Charles County. The Board is made up of 7 at-large members and 1 student member. The Board establishes educational and fiscal policy, provides overall direction and governs Charles County Public Schools. Board members serve four-year terms. The Student Board member serves a one-year term. The next election is in November 2022.

Following legislation passed in the 2021 Maryland General Assembly Regular Session, the Board of Education will consist of 10 members following the 2022 Maryland gubernatorial election. The school board will have 1 at-large member, 2 members from each Commissioner district (8 total), and 1 voting student member. The student member gained a vote in all matters except capital and operating budgets, personnel decisions, and a few other minor exclusions. The legislation also restricted Board members to serving no more than 3 consecutive terms.

* denotes Chairman of Board of Education.

** denotes Vice Chairman of Board of Education.

Student Member of the Board 
The Charles County Board of Education is one of few Boards of Education in the nation to have a voting Student Board member. The Student Member of the Board has a vote on all matters except capital and operating budgets, personnel decisions, and a few other minor exclusions.

* While Lindsey Adkisson's two terms were counted separately, Ian Herd's were counted together.

Schools

High schools
La Plata High School (La Plata)
Henry E. Lackey High School (Indian Head)
Maurice J. McDonough High School (Pomfret)
North Point High School (Waldorf)
Thomas Stone High School (Waldorf)
Westlake High School (Waldorf)
St. Charles High School (Waldorf)

Middle schools
Theodore G. Davis (Waldorf)
John Hanson (Waldorf)
Matthew Henson (Pomonkey)
Mattawoman (Waldorf)
Piccowaxen (Newburg)
General Smallwood (Potomac Heights)
Milton M. Somers (La Plata)
Benjamin Stoddert (St. Charles)

Elementary schools
C. Paul Barnhart (Waldorf)			
Berry (Waldorf)
Dr. Gustavus Brown (Waldorf)
Dr. James Craik (Pomfret)
William A. Diggs (Waldorf)
Gale-Bailey (Marbury)
Dr. Thomas L. Higdon (Newburg)
Indian Head (Indian Head)
Daniel of St. Thomas Jenifer (Waldorf)
Malcolm (Malcolm)
T.C. Martin (Bryantown)
Mary H. Matula (La Plata)
Arthur Middleton (Waldorf)
Walter J. Mitchell (La Plata)
Mt. Hope/Nanjemoy (Nanjemoy)
Dr. Samuel A. Mudd (Waldorf)
Mary Burgess Neal (Waldorf)	
J.C. Parks (Pomonkey)
J.P. Ryon (Waldorf)
Eva Turner (St. Charles)
William B. Wade (Waldorf)

Other
Special Education Department, Assistive Technology Center
Adult Education Services, External Diploma Program, Adult Services Center
F.B. Gwynn Educational Center
Adult Education Services, Lifelong Learning Center
Nanjemoy Creek Environmental Education Center
Robert D. Stethem Educational Center
James E. Richmond Science Center

References

External links
Charles County Public Schools

School districts in Maryland
Education in Charles County, Maryland
1916 establishments in Maryland
School districts established in 1916